Fort Marrow is a historic American Civil War fort and archaeological site located near Huttonsville, Randolph County, West Virginia.  It was built by the Union Army as part of the defenses for Camp Elkwater.  It is a seven-sided, enclosed earthen redoubt.  Associated with it is a nearby tent / hut site, now represented by 10 depressions in the earth.

It was listed on the National Register of Historic Places in 2010.

References

Archaeological sites on the National Register of Historic Places in West Virginia
Government buildings completed in 1861
Buildings and structures in Randolph County, West Virginia
National Register of Historic Places in Randolph County, West Virginia
Marrow
1861 establishments in Virginia